Anchiale marmorata is a medium-sized stick insect found in Papua New Guinea. This species is very similar to A. modesta but females are smaller in size and have shorter legs.

References

External links
Phasmida Species File

Phasmatodea
Insects described in 1908